Abbas Yales-e Yek (also Romanized as ‘Abbās Yāles-e Yek; also known as ‘Abbās-e Yālīs and ‘Abbāsī) is a village in Tarrah Rural District, Hamidiyeh District, Ahvaz County, Khuzestan Province, Iran. At the 2006 census, its population was 127, in 21 families.

References 

Populated places in Ahvaz County